The 2008 Air Force Falcons football team represented the United States Air Force Academy during the 2008 NCAA Division I FBS football season. Air Force competed as a member of the Mountain West Conference (MWC). The team was led by second-year head coach Troy Calhoun and played their home games at Falcon Stadium. The Falcons finished the season 8–5, 5–3 in Mountain West play to finish in fourth place. They were invited to the Armed Forces Bowl where they lost to Houston.

Schedule

Roster
QB Tim Jefferson, Fr.

References

Air Force
Air Force Falcons football seasons
Air Force Falcons football